Pricena (Arabic: برايسنا) is a shopping comparison engine serving the Middle East. The site was initially launched in 2013 in the United Arab Emirates, then expanded to Egypt, Saudi Arabia, Kuwait, and Qatar, as well as Nigeria, South Africa, and India.
The origin of the name Pricena (pronounced Price-na) comes from a contraction of the words "Price" and "na", the latter meaning "our" in Arabic, thus forming "Our Price". The site allows online shoppers to compare prices of more than one million products from over 200 stores across the Middle East.

Online Startup of the Year 2015 Award 
In November 2015, Pricena was recognized as the Online Startup of the Year for 2015 by Du Enterprise Agility Awards. The award's criteria were based on a startup’s purpose to solve a specific and clear regional problem, its ability to attract a sizable audience and its potential to further grow in the region and beyond.

References

External links
 

Internet properties established in 2013
Comparison shopping websites